Stary Syntash (İśke Hıntaş) is a rural locality (a village) in Kucherbayevsky Selsoviet, Blagovarsky District, Bashkortostan, Russia. The population was 37 as of 2010. There is 1 street.

Geography 
Stary Syntash is located 35 km north of Yazykovo (the district's administrative centre) by road. Novy Syntash is the nearest rural locality.

References 

Rural localities in Blagovarsky District